Corinthian leather is a term coined by the advertising agency Bozell in 1974 to describe the leather upholstery used in certain Chrysler luxury vehicles. Although merely a marketing concept, it suggested a premium product, "something rich in quality, rare, and luxurious".  In reality, it was the same leather used in most Chryslers, produced by the Radel Leather Manufacturing Company in Newark, New Jersey.

While the term was first used during the marketing campaign for the top-of-the-line 1974 Imperial LeBaron, it is usually associated with the introduction of the 1975 Cordoba, an intermediate-sized personal luxury car.  The model's celebrity spokesperson, Ricardo Montalbán, is credited with indelibly linking the two.  In promoting the Cordoba he described the thickly-cushioned luxury of seats "available even in fine (alternately, "soft" or "rich") Corinthian leather".  Later, in promoting the Chrysler New Yorker in 1988, he again referred to the leather as "rich".

Some sources conflate the term with vinyl used in place of leather for non-seating/non-touch surfaces such as the front seat backs, backs of head rests, and lower parts of door facings.  This is a misconception, as such vinyl "trim" was simply an unmentioned part of the automobile's "Corinthian leather" interior package.

When Montalbán was asked by David Letterman on Late Night with David Letterman what the term denoted, the actor cheerfully admitted that the term meant nothing.

Literary scholar Paul Fussell, in his 1991 book BAD – Or, The Dumbing of America, claimed that the name was chosen "because a reference book suggested that Corinthian connotes rich desirability", so as to appeal to people who love luxury, as the people of Ancient Corinth were said to.  Fussell then advanced that the love of the Corinthians for luxury was "why Saint Paul selected them to receive one of his loudest moral blasts.  He told them, 'It is reported that there is fornication among you...'" Fussell added that whoever came up with the term would have to admit that they "never saw Corinth at all".

Trivia
In the episode "Drift Problem" of the animated adult show Archer, Sterling Archer receives a Dodge Challenger for his birthday whose upholstery is "rich Corinthian leather." He then exclaims "Corinth is famous for its leather!"

In Puss in Boots, there is a line describing the titular character as wearing boots "made of the finest Corinthian leather."

References

External links
Ricardo Montalban - 1975 Chrysler Cordoba Commercial YouTube
Ricardo Montalban - 1975 Chrysler Cordoba Commercial YouTube
Ricardo Montalban - 1980 Chrysler Cordoba Commercial YouTube
Web page featuring David Letterman interviewing Ricardo Montalbán about Corinthian Leather Cordoba Club USA

Chrysler
Leather
Deception
American advertising slogans
1974 neologisms